The ICOM IC-905 is a multimode VHF/UHF/SHF portable amateur radio transceiver. The radio has between 10 and 0.5 watts of transmitter output depending on the frequency selected. The IC-905 has support for a wide variety of commonly used amateur radio modes including the Japan Amateur Radio League's digital voice mode DSTAR. The form factor of the control head for the IC-905 is similar to that of the IC-705 and includes its large screen and spectrum scope. With the radio unit being remotely controlled from a distance in order to reduce loss over long coax cable runs. This is an important adaptation for this radio system as losses increase with the frequency being used. The IC-905 uses a built in GPS receiver to stabilize its frequency and time base. It has been noted that the IC-905 has a wide range of frequencies but lacks the 220MHz and 900MHz amateur bands as these are only available in North America and not Japan. The unit supports up to four external antennas (one being for GPS reception) and has built in support for wired Ethernet, USB Type C and an SD card reader. The addition of a USB connector allows users to connect their computers to the IC-905 for running digital data modes such as PSK31, or FT8, the integration of Ethernet support will be a useful feature for mobile contesters.

Specifications 
Specifications of the ICOM IC-905:
 Frequency range: transmit: 144 – 5600 MHz (Amateur Bands Only)
 Modes of emission: A1A (CW), A3E (AM), J3E (LSB, USB), F3E (FM),
 Output connectors: N connector 144–1200 MHz, SMA 2400 Mhz and 5600 MHz
 Supply voltage: 13.8 VDC external
 Output power: 10 W 144–1200 MHz, 2 W 2400 & 5600 MHz, 0.5 W 10 GHz

References 

Amateur radio transceivers